Sadovy is a rural locality (a khutor) in Ayryumovskoye Rural Settlement of Giaginsky District, Adygea, Russia. The population of this khutor was 202 as of 2018. There are 2 streets.

Geography 
Sadovy is located 22 km southeast of Giaginskaya (the district's administrative centre) by road. Krasny Khleborob is the nearest rural locality.

References 

Rural localities in Giaginsky District